Michael Caputo (born September 18, 1957) is an American politician serving as a Democratic member of the West Virginia Senate, representing the 13th District since 2020. Caputo was the only new Democratic senator elected in the 2020 Senate elections.

Prior his election to the Senate, Caputo represented the 50th District in the West Virginia House of Delegates for 24 years and was most recently serving as Minority Whip. Caputo also served as majority whip for eight years until the Republicans took the majority in 2014.

He was born and raised in Rivesville, West Virginia and attended Rivesville Elementary School and Rivesville High School. He is a career coal miner and a member of the United Mine Workers of America.

Elections

2020: After nearly 25 years in the House, Caputo decided to run for the seat held by the retiring Minority Leader Roman Prezioso. A retired coal miner and former district vice president for the United Mine Workers of America, Caputo ran unopposed in the Democratic primary. Caputo faced retired teacher and Republican nominee Rebecca Polis in the November general election. Caputo beat Polis by a comfortable 56-44% margin.

Controversy

Caputo was criminally charged for an incident where he allegedly kicked open a door to the House chamber which struck an assistant doorkeeper during the final week of the 2019 legislative session.

According to a criminal complaint filed by Capitol Police in Kanawha County Magistrate Court, Caputo – after being angered by an anti-Muslim display placed outside the House Chamber in March – pushed or kicked the door to the chamber open, hitting an assistant doorkeeper. Witnesses saw Caputo hit the doorkeeper with the door, who sought medical attention afterward. Caputo also allegedly injured a delegate on his way to his seat.

Caputo apologized in a floor speech the next day for kicking the door and was removed from all committee assignments by House leadership as punishment. Efforts by some House Republicans to remove Caputo from office or censure Caputo failed, and charges were eventually dismissed by the Kanawha County Circuit Court citing Caputo's legislative immunity.

References

External links
West Virginia Legislature - Senator Mike Caputo official government website
Project Vote Smart - Representative Michael 'Mike' Caputo (WV) profile
West Virginia House of Delegates Minority Whip Mike Caputo Faces Possible Censure, Expulsion for Kicking Door, Injuring Staffer
Follow the Money - Mike Caputo
2008 2006 2004 2002 2000 1998 campaign contributions

Democratic Party West Virginia state senators
1957 births
Living people
Politicians from Fairmont, West Virginia
American coal miners
21st-century American politicians